Chermoshnya is a village in Shchyokinsky District of Tula Oblast, Russia.
 Latitude: 53° 46' 00" North Latitude
 Longitude: 37° 31' 00" East Longitude
 Height above sea level: 246 m

History
Since 1832, it belonged to the parents of Fyodor Dostoevsky, where the writer spent his childhood. The village is also mentioned a few times in his novel The Brothers Karamazov.

References

Rural localities in Tula Oblast